Soho Incident, released in the United States as Spin a Dark Web, is a 1956 British film noir directed by Vernon Sewell and starring Faith Domergue and Lee Patterson.

The screenplay is based on Wide Boys Never Work, a novel by Robert Westerby.

Plot
Jim Bankley (Patterson) a Canadian veteran living in London, is trying to succeed as a prizefighter, without much luck. He falls in love with the vile Bella Francesi (Domergue), sister of  local Sicilian mob leader Rico Francesi (Benson), and she soon draws him into the gang's activities. When he finds himself being drawn into a murder plot, he finally realizes that his lover is only using him and determines to escape the gang - but things don't turn out the way he planned.

Cast
 Faith Domergue as Bella Francesi  
 Lee Patterson as Jim Bankley  
 Rona Anderson as Betty Walker  
 Martin Benson as Rico Francesi  
 Robert Arden as Buddy  
 Joss Ambler as Tom Walker  
 Peter Hammond as Bill Walker  
 Peter Burton as Inspector Collis  
 Sam Kydd as Sam
 Russell Westwood as Mick
 Patricia Ryan as Audrey
 Bernard Fox as McLeod

References

External links
 
 
 

1956 films
1956 crime films
Film noir
Films set in London
Columbia Pictures films
British crime films
1950s English-language films
1950s British films
British black-and-white films